Hypsipetes virescens may refer to:

 Nicobar bulbul, a species of bird found on the Nicobar Islands 
 Olive bulbul, a species of bird found in Southeast Asia
 Sunda bulbul, a species of bird found on Sumatra and Java